Tenant Weatherly (January 1851 - ?) was a state legislator in Mississippi. He represented Holmes County, Mississippi from 1874 to 1875 and 1880 to 1881 in the Mississippi House of Representatives. He was a Methodist.

Initially no representative was listed for Holmes County in the 1880 legislature as the registrars referred an issue to the House to decide the outcome.
The issue had been that the voting box from Acona had been lost or destroyed along with approximately 300 votes.
The House decided to elect those with the highest votes from the rest of the county, thus appointing Weatherly along with H. Christmas and C. T. Murphy.

See also
African-American officeholders during and following the Reconstruction era

References

1851 births
Members of the Mississippi House of Representatives
People from Holmes County, Mississippi
Year of death missing